The following lists events that happened during 1941 in South Africa.

Incumbents
 Monarch: King George VI.
 Governor-General and High Commissioner for Southern Africa: Sir Patrick Duncan
 Prime Minister: Jan Christiaan Smuts.
 Chief Justice: James Stratford then Nicolaas Jacobus de Wet.

Events
May
 28 – Jan Smuts, Prime Minister of South Africa, is appointed as a Field Marshal of the British Army.
 The 13-year-old George Bizos, with his father, help 7 New Zealand soldiers escape Nazi occupied Greece to Crete.

December
 8 – The Union of South Africa declares war on Finland, Romania, Hungary and Japan.
 31 – The Union of South Africa declares war on Bulgaria.

Births
30 January – Henry Cele, actor (d. 2008)
 31 January – Eugène Terre'Blanche, Afrikaner right-wing founder of the Afrikaner Weerstandsbeweging. (d. 2010)
 2 April – Njongonkulu Ndungane, Anglican bishop & a former prisoner on Robben Island
 30 June – Peter Pollock, cricketer, brother of cricket administrator Graeme Pollock, father of cricketer Shaun Pollock
 28 August – Joseph Shabalala, musician & founder of Ladysmith Black Mambazo (d. 2020)
 2 September – David Bale, businessman, father of Christian Bale and husband of Gloria Steinem. (d. 2003)
 10 September – Christo Wiese, businessman and former billionaire, chairman of Pepkor
 25 September – Rick Turner, activist and academic. (d. 1978)

Deaths
 20 April – Pat Pattle DFC and Bar, fighter pilot. (b. 1914)
 11 June – Andries Abraham Stockenström le Fleur, Griqua leader and visionary.
 17 September – Newell Orton, fighter pilot.

Railways

Sports

References

History of South Africa